Edward "Sonnyboy" Bhengu (8 November 1934 – 26 December 2010) was a South African activist and founding member of the Pan Africanist Congress of Azania.

Edward 'Sonnyboy' Bhengu, also known affectionately as 'Bra Sanza', was the older brother of poet Don Mattera and was imprisoned numerous times for his anti-apartheid activities. He died in Soweto on 26 December 2010 of liver complications.

References

1934 births
2010 deaths
Anti-apartheid activists
South African activists
People from Soweto
Pan Africanist Congress of Azania politicians